This is a chronological list of parliamentary constituencies in the Kingdom of Great Britain and its successor state the United Kingdom which were represented by sitting prime ministers.

A majority of constituencies are or were (in the case of those abolished) in England, apart from three in Wales and six in Scotland. No prime minister has represented a constituency in Ireland or Northern Ireland.

References

External links
 Prime Ministers in History, 10 Downing Street website

Prime Ministers
Constituencies